Wolf Jobst Siedler (17 January 1926 – 27 November 2013) was a German publisher and writer.

Life 
Born in Berlin, he studied at the Freie Universität and worked as a journalist. His publishing house Wolf Jobst Siedler Verlag was bought in 1989 by Bertelsmann-Gruppe.

He has authored several books and wrote for many German publications including the Frankfurter Allgemeine Zeitung, the Süddeutsche Zeitung, Die Zeit, Die Welt and Junge Freiheit.

Siedler was interviewed about his assessments of Albert Speer in the docudrama Speer und Er.

Honours
 Karl-Friedrich-Schinkel-Ring
 Ernst-Robert-Curtius-Preis
 Deutscher Nationalpreis (2002)
 Gerhard Löwenthal Prize, honorary prize

References

Sources
Clive James, Cultural Amnesia: Necessary Memories from History and the Arts (2007)

1926 births
2013 deaths
Knights Commander of the Order of Merit of the Federal Republic of Germany
German male writers
People from Berlin
People from Steglitz-Zehlendorf